The Rosary is a novel by Florence L. Barclay. It was first published in 1909 by G.P. Putnam's Sons and was a bestselling novel for many years running, reaching the number one spot in 1910. It was adapted into five films. Two of these films are Le Rosaire, directed by Tony Lekain (France, 1934) and El rosario, directed by Juan José Ortega (Mexico, 1944).

References

External links

 

1909 British novels
British novels adapted into films